"Imagination" is a song by American singer La Toya Jackson. It is taken from her fourth album, Imagination. A remixed version of the song was released as a 7" and 12" single.

Some versions of the single include a dub version or extended remix of "Private Joy", a track from her third, and more successful, album Heart Don't Lie.

The single was only released in the United States as a promo.

Versions
 "Imagination" Album version (4:20)
 "Imagination (Remix)" (2:58)
 "Imagination (Dub Mix)" (5:30)
 "Imagination (Hot Dance Remix)" (6:00)

References 

1986 songs
La Toya Jackson songs
Songs written by Amir Bayyan